Idlewilde is a historic boarding house site  built between 1907-1910 at what is now the Indian Springs State Park in Butts County, Georgia. Two granddaughters of Robert Grier, a famous 19th century astronomer and author of the Grier Almanac, built Idlewilde and its gardens. It was operated as a boarding house until 1925. Mr. and Mrs. Willis B. Powell owned the house until 1943 and their guests included Franklin Delano Roosevelt. The property was then owned by Mrs. Linda T. Rastello until 1979 when she sold it to the State of Georgia. It has been used as the administrative offices of the park since March, 1995. It was placed on the National Register of Historic Places in March, 1999. The administrative offices of Indian Springs State Park have been in Idlewilde since March 1995. The park includes waters considered medicinal by Native Americans, giving the park its name, stone buildings and walls built by President Franklin D. Roosevelt's CCC work crews during the Great Depression, and history of the resort hotels of the area from the early 20th Century. The offices are well preserved and include pine floors, beveled glass windows, and a striking staircase.

See also
National Register of Historic Places listings in Butts County, Georgia

References

Residential buildings on the National Register of Historic Places in Georgia (U.S. state)
Buildings and structures in Butts County, Georgia
National Register of Historic Places in Butts County, Georgia